Robert Twyford may refer to:

 Robert Twyford (MP), Member of Parliament for Derbyshire, 1378
 A watchman in Birmingham, England who was the subject of the 1814 Death of Robert Twyford
 Robert E. Twyford (died 1942) who founded the Twyford Motor Car Company